The 1984 Australia Day Honours were announced on 26 January 1984 by the Governor General of Australia, Sir Ninian Stephen.

The Australia Day Honours are the first of the two major annual honours lists, announced on Australia Day (26 January), with the other being the Queen's Birthday Honours which are announced on the second Monday in June.

Order of Australia

Companion of the Order of Australia (AC)

Officer of the Order of Australia (AO)

General Division

Military Division

Member of the Order of Australia (AM)

General Division

Military Division

Medal of the Order of Australia (OAM)

General Division

Military Division

References

1984 awards
Orders, decorations, and medals of Australia
1984 in Australia